Getatchew Haile (April 19, 1931 – June 10, 2021) was an Ethiopian-American philologist widely considered the foremost scholar of the Ge'ez language and one of its most prolific (he published more than 150 books and articles). He was acknowledged for his contributions to the field with a MacArthur Fellows Program "genius" award and the Edward Ullendorff Medal from the Council of the British Academy. He was the first Ethiopian and the first African to win the award.

Early life 
Haile was born in the rural village of Tute in Shenkora (part of the province of Shoa in the Ethiopian Empire).  As a boy, he attended an Ethiopian Orthodox Church school, where he learned Ge'ez and "devoted his energies to reading and understanding the texts."

From 1945 to 1951 he attended Trinity School in Addis Ababa.  Haile moved to Cairo in 1952, and lived there through most of the 1950s, graduating from the Coptic Theological College, Cairo, Egypt with a B.D. in 1957, and from the American University in Cairo, with a B.A. in 1957. He then moved to Germany in 1957, where he received from the Eberhard-Karls-Universität Tübingen a Ph.D. in Semitic Philology in 1962. The title of his dissertation was Das Verbalsystem im Äthiopischen: Ein morphologischer Vergleich mit den orientalischen semitischen Sprachen. Haile married Misrak Amare on July 12, 1964, in Sidamo.

In 1974, Haile became a member of the transitional Ethiopian Parliament from Shoa province. Due to his opposition to the Derg junta, government soldiers came to his home to arrest him in 1975.  He was involved in a shootout and eventually shot and captured.  After the BBC World Service and Voice of America reported on his arrest, the government released him. Through the intervention of friends, Haile was allowed to travel to London for medical treatment. He became paraplegic due to severe damage to his spinal cord, and needed to use a wheelchair for the remainder of his life.

Academic career 
Haile was associate professor in the Department of Ethiopian Languages and Literature, Haile Selassie I University (now Addis Ababa University), from 1962 to 1969, and 1971 to 1974, where he taught Amharic Grammar, Amharic Literature, Ge’ez Grammar, Ge’ez Literature, Arabic Grammar, and Semitic Linguistics. He was appointed head of the department in 1965.

After arriving in the U.S. in 1976, Haile joined Saint John's University in Collegeville, Minnesota.  He eventually became a Regents Professor Emeritus of Medieval Studies and Curator Emeritus of the Ethiopian Study Center at the Hill Museum & Manuscript Library. At HMML, he prepared catalogues of more than six thousand Ethiopian manuscripts and trained Ethiopic manuscript cataloguers in paleography, dating, and other skills.

He was on the advisory board of a number of journals, including Comité de lecture of Analecta Bollandiana (Journal of Christian Hagiography), Ethiopian Journal of Education, Journal of Ethiopian Studies, Northeast African Studies, Ethiopian Register (1994–2001), and Acta Aethiopica (1980–89).

In addition to his writings and translations of a variety of works on Ethiopia and the Orthodox church, he produced two two-volume books on the history and beliefs of Abba Estifanos of Gwendagwende, one in 2006 and the other in 2011. His first translation, into Amharic, was of Mark Twain’s short story Extracts from Adam's Diary in 1965.

The languages in which he worked were Amharic, Ge'ez, Arabic, Hebrew, Latin, Greek, German, and Coptic.

Reputation 
Haile's work has frequently been described as foundational to the field of Ethiopian studies and has won many awards.

Edward Ullendorff, professor of Semitic studies at the School of Oriental and Asian Studies, described Haile's work as "highly significant" due to his "profoundly erudite" knowledge of Ethiopic language and literature. On another occasion, Ullendorff wrote that Haile's work represented the "most meticulous and original study of Ethiopic literature" ever done, and "on a scale and depth never before attempted." He added, "no other person before Getatchew Haile has ever been able to survey so much of Ethiopic literary creation and thus to gain so sovereign a command of this genre", which made a contribution not only to Ethiopian studies but also the study of Christian oriental writing more generally.

The Ethiopian poet Amha Asfaw wrote a poem in Amharic for him in 1999.

Personal life 
Haile and his wife, Misrak Amare, had four children, adopted two more, and had many grandchildren. Among his children are the material science professor Sossina M. Haile and the author Rebecca G. Haile.

Haile served as a confidante of the Patriarch of the Ethiopian Orthodox Church in the 1960s, as well as the Church's representative to the World Council of Churches.

Haile never returned to Ethiopia after leaving in 1975.  He remained critical of the successive Ethiopian governments: in 2005, Ethiopian authorities charged him in absentia with treason for his comments.

Haile and his wife moved to New York City in 2016. He died at Mount Sinai Morningside hospital on June 10, 2021, at the age of 90. President Sahle-Work Zewde expressed her condolences to Haile's family in a press release.

Lectures 
Haile gave a video lecture on the Täˀammərä Maryam, the Ethiopian Miracles of Mary stories, on May 23, 2020. Alessandro Bausi (professor, University of Hamburg), Kay Shelemay (professor, Harvard University), Elias Wondimu (CEO of Tsehai Publishers), and Habtamu Tegegne (professor, Rutgers University) spoke about Getatchew Haile's contributions.

In 2018, he gave an Amharic-language interview for EBS TV at the Minneapolis Institute of Art.  He also gave a video lecture at the Hill Museum & Manuscript Library in April 2020.

Honors and distinctions
Abebe Bikila's Life Time Achievement Award, 2018
Honoree of a festschrift volume in 2017: Studies in Ethiopian Languages, Literature, and History Festschrift for Getatchew Haile Presented by his Friends and Colleagues
Council of the British Academy, Edward Ullendorff Medal 2014, awarded for scholarly distinction and achievements in the field of Semitic languages or Ethiopian studies
Society of Ethiopians Established in Diaspora Annual Award, 1986
Corresponding Fellow of the British Academy, 1987–2021
MacArthur Fellows Program, John D. and Catherine T. MacArthur Fellowship, 1988–1993
Ethiopian Government Award for academic excellence, 1991 (declined)
Member, Ethiopian Parliament, representing the province of Shoa, 1974–75

Books
The Homily of Zär'a Ya'əqob's Mäshafä Bərhan on the Rite of Baptism and Religious Instruction CSCO, text, Vol. 653/114, and trans., Vol. 654/115. Louvain: Peeters, 2013
Voices from Däbrä Zämäddo: Acts of Abba Bärtälomewos and Abba Yoḥannǝs 45 Miracles of Mary (Aethiopistische Forschungen 79), Wiesbaden 2013
A History of the first Estifanosite Monks. 2 vols. (ed. & tr.) Louvain: Peeters, 2011, 
Amdafta Lawgahu (Let Me Entertain You for a Moment: An Amharic Autobiography), Collegeville, (Minnesota), 2008
The Ge'ez Acts of Abba Esṭifanos of Gwendagwende, 2 vols. (ed. & tr.). Louvain: Peeters Publishers, 2006, 
Deqiqe Istifanos: Behigg Amlak (Hagiographies of the Estifanosite monks who flourished and were martyred in the fifteenth century, in Amharic), Collegeville (Minnesota), 2004
Ya’Abā Bā’rey Dersatoč (The Works of Abba Bā’rey with Other Documents Concerning the Oromo, in Amharic), Collegeville (Minnesota), 2002
Bahra Hassab (= Computus). (On the Ethiopian Calendar, with Annals of Ethiopian History, in Amharic), Collegeville (Minnesota), 2000.
A Catalogue of Ethiopian Manuscripts Microfilmed for the Ethiopian Manuscript Microfilm Library, Addis Ababa and for the Hill Monastic Manuscript Library, Collegeville, Vol. X: Project Numbers 4001–5000, Collegeville, (Minnesota) 1993
The Mariology of Emperor Zära Ya’qob of Ethiopia (Orientalia Christiana Analecta, No. 242), Rome 1992
Beauty of the Creation, with Misrak Amare, University of Manchester, 1991
The Epistle of Humanity of Emperor Zär’a Ya’qob (Ṭomarä Tsb’t), Corpus Scriptorum Christianorum Orientalium series, Vol. 522/Aeth. 95, tr. 523/Aeth. 96 (1991)
The Faith of the Unctionists in the Ethiopian Church (Haymanot Msi’awit), Corpus Scriptorum Christianorum Orientalium series, Vol. 517/Aeth. 91 (1990)
A Catalogue of Ethiopian Manuscripts Microfilmed for the Ethiopian Manuscript Microfilm Library, Addis Ababa and for the Hill Monastic Manuscript Library, Collegeville, Vol. IX: Project Numbers 3501–4000, Collegeville, (Minnesota) 1987. 
The Different Collections of Nägś Hymns of the Ethiopic Literature (Oikonomia No. 19), Erlangen (Germany), 1983
A Catalogue of Ethiopian Manuscripts Microfilmed for the Ethiopian Manuscript Microfilm Library, Addis Ababa and for the Hill Monastic Manuscript Library, Collegeville, Vol. VIII: Project Numbers 3001–3500, Collegeville, (Minnesota) 1985
A Catalogue of Ethiopian Manuscripts Microfilmed for the Ethiopian Manuscript Microfilm Library, Addis Ababa and for the Hill Monastic Manuscript Library, Collegeville, Vol. VII: Project Numbers 2501–3000, (with a checklist by William F. Macomber), Collegeville, (Minnesota) 1983
A Catalogue of Ethiopian Manuscripts Microfilmed for the Ethiopian Manuscript Microfilm Library, Addis Ababa and for the Hill Monastic Manuscript Library, Collegeville, Vol. VI: Project Numbers 2001–2500, (with a checklist by William F. Macomber), Collegeville, (Minnesota) 1982
A Catalogue of Ethiopian Manuscripts Microfilmed for the Ethiopian Manuscript Microfilm Library, Addis Ababa and for the Hill Monastic Manuscript Library, Collegeville, Vol. V: Project Numbers 1501–2000, (with a checklist by William F. Macomber) Collegeville, (Minnesota) 1981
A Catalogue of Ethiopian Manuscripts Microfilmed for the Ethiopian Manuscript Microfilm Library, Addis Ababa and for the Hill Monastic Manuscript Library, Collegeville, Vol. IV: Project Numbers 1101–1500, Collegeville, (Minnesota) 1979
Mark Twain's Letters from Earth (adapted into Amharic from the German version, Tagebuch von Adam und Eva), Addis Ababa, 1968
Das Verbalsystem im Äthiopischen. Ein morphologischer Vergleich mit den orientalischen semitischen Sprachen. Diss., Tübingen 1962

References

External links 

 The Ge'ez Acts of Abba Esṭifanos of Gwendagwende

1931 births
2021 deaths
American philologists
Academic staff of Addis Ababa University
Ethiopian emigrants to the United States
University of Tübingen alumni
The American University in Cairo alumni
College of Saint Benedict and Saint John's University faculty
MacArthur Fellows
Corresponding Fellows of the British Academy
People from Amhara Region
People with paraplegia
Members of the Federal Parliamentary Assembly
Wheelchair users